Alonzo Watson (1891 –1937) was an American volunteer who fought for the Loyalists during the Spanish Civil War (1936-1939) and was killed in action.

Biographical sketch
Alonzo Watson was born in Chicago, Illinois in 1891. A veteran of World War I and painter, Watson had moved to New York City –joining the Communist Party upon finding common cause with its Harlem activism in the 1930s. He left New York City for Spain on the day after Christmas in 1936 on the SS Normandie –one of the first group of volunteers to see service in the American outfit known as the Abraham Lincoln Brigade. Staffed mostly by Americans who supported the Second Spanish Republic against the coup led by General Francisco Franco, the Lincoln Brigadists composed the first completely integrated American fighting force.

Alonzo Watson died in February 1937 at the Battle of Jarama. Fellow veteran John Tisa recalls that Watson died in hand-to-hand combat.

His name occurs briefly as a historical character in Captain Blackman (1972), a novel written by African American writer John Alfred Williams and Bruce Palmer's They Shall Not Pass: A Novel of the Spanish Civil War (1971).

See also

Oliver Law

References

External links
 James Yates "Mississippi to Madrid" http://www.alba-valb.org/volunteers/james-yates

1891 births
1937 deaths
Abraham Lincoln Brigade members
African Americans in World War I
American communists
American military personnel of World War I
American anti-fascists
People from Chicago
Military personnel killed in the Spanish Civil War
Members of the Communist Party USA